John Nicholson Campbell (March 4, 1798 – March 27, 1864) was a Presbyterian clergyman who served as Chaplain of the United States House of Representatives.

Early life 

Campbell was born in Philadelphia, Pennsylvania, on March 4, 1798.  He was a pupil of James Ross, a celebrated teacher of Philadelphia, and at an early age entered the University of Pennsylvania, but was never graduated. He studied theology with Rev. Ezra Stiles, and afterward in Virginia, where he was for a few months teacher of languages in Hampden-Sydney College. On 10 May 1817, he was licensed to preach by the Presbytery of Hanover, Virginia.

Ministry 

After preaching in Petersburg, Virginia, and New Bern, North Carolina,  he became in 1823 the assistant of Rev. Dr. Balch, of Georgetown, District of Columbia, and in 1825 accepted a call to the pastorate of Second Presbyterian Church, Washington, D.C., where Presidents John Quincy Adams and Andrew Jackson, as well as Vice President John C. Calhoun, worshipped in the 1820s. He also was active in the American Colonization Society, In 1830, Rev. Campbell and others were accused by Peggy Eaton of repeating the rumour that before her marriage, she dined with John Eaton in Philadelphia without a chaperone. Appointed Secretary of War by Jackson, John Eaton and his wife became a social controversy. As the social snubbing and other issues divided politicians, President Jackson's entire cabinet resigned, Vice President Calhoun resigned and Reverend Campbell stepped down from his pulpit.

Chaplain of the House of Representatives 

On November 18, 1820, 22-year-old Presbyterian minister John Nicholson Campbell was named Chaplain of the U.S. House of Representatives.

After Washington 

In 1831, Campbell was called to the First Presbyterian Church in Albany, New York, and remained there until his death.

References 
 

1798 births
1864 deaths
Chaplains of the United States House of Representatives
American Presbyterian ministers
Clergy from Philadelphia
Religious leaders from Albany, New York
19th-century American clergy